Route 2 is a highway in western Missouri. Its eastern terminus is at Route 52 in Windsor.

Route description
Route 2 begins at the Kansas state line in Cass County. The first town is passes through is West Line, followed by Freeman. In Harrisonville it has a brief concurrency with Interstate 49/U.S. Route 71. After splitting from I-49/US 71, it runs east into Johnson County, Missouri, crossing over near La Tour. It serves as the southern terminus of Route 131  before crossing Route 13 north of Postoak. It then runs through Leeton before entering Henry County. It then ends at Route 52.

History
Route 2 was initially Route 60, designated in 1922 between Leeton and Windsor. It was renumbered in 1926 due to US 60.

Junction list

References

External links

002
Transportation in Cass County, Missouri
Transportation in Johnson County, Missouri
Transportation in Henry County, Missouri